Beck Peak is a peak,  high, on the east flank of Amundsen Glacier, standing  northwest of Mount Stubberud on the ridge descending from the northern Nilsen Plateau, Queen Maud Mountains. This peak appears to have been first mapped from air and ground photos taken by the Byrd Antarctic Expedition, 1928–30. It was mapped in greater detail by the United States Geological Survey from surveys and from U.S. Navy air photos, 1960–64. The peak was named by the Advisory Committee on Antarctic Names for Andreas Beck, a crew member and ice pilot on Amundsen's South Pole expedition of 1910–12.

References 

Mountains of the Ross Dependency
Amundsen Coast